Betina Langerhuus (born 1968) is a Danish former cricketer. She played six Women's One Day International matches for the Denmark women's national cricket team between 1989 and 1990.

References

External links
 

1968 births
Living people
Danish women cricketers
Denmark women One Day International cricketers
Place of birth missing (living people)